Fabio Pusterla (born 1957, in Mendrisio, Switzerland) is a Swiss translator and writer in Italian.

Pusterla studied in the University of Pavia and is a teacher in Lugano and at the University of Geneva. He has translated French poetry to Italian, including Philippe Jaccottet, Antoine Emaz and Corinna Bille. Pusterla has won the Swiss Schiller Prize and the Gottfried Keller Preis, 2007. He was editor of the review "Idra" (1988–1998).

Poetry 

Concessione all'inverno, Bellinzona, Casagrande, 1985 [2a ed. 2001] (Montale Prize and Schiller Prize).
Bocksten, Marcos y Marcos, Milano, 1989 [2a ed. 2003].
Le cose senza storia, Marcos y Marcos, Milan, 1994.
Danza macabra, Lietocollelibri, Faloppio, 1995.
Isla persa, Edizioni Il Salice, 1997, (2a ed. 1998).
Pietra sangue, Marcos y Marcos, Milan, 1999 (Premio Schiller 2000, finalista Premio Viareggio e Grandovere 2001).
Me voici là dans le noir, trad. de l'italien par Mathilde Vischer, Moudon, Editions Empreintes, 2001.
Une voix pour le noir: poésies 1985–1999, trad. de l'italien par Mathilde Vischer, préf. de Philippe Jaccottet, Lausanne, Editions d'En bas, 2001.
Les choses sans histoire – Le cose senza storia, trad. de l'italien par Mathilde Vischer, préf. de Mattia Cavadini, Moudon, Editions Empreintes, 2002.
Deux rives, trad. de l'italien par Béatrice de Jurquet et Philippe Jaccottet, préf. de Béatrice de Jurquet, postf. de l'auteur, Le Chambon-sur-Lignon, Cheyne éditeur, 2002.
Solange Zeit bleibt: Gedichte Italienisch und Deutsch = Dum vacat, ausgew., übers. und mit einem Vorw. von Hanno Helbling, postf. di Massimo Raffaeli, Zurigo, Limmat Verlag, 2002.
Sette frammenti dalla terra di nessuno, elaborazione grafica di Livio Schiozzi, Flussi, 2003.
Folla sommersa, Milan, Marco y Marcos, 2004.
Movimenti sull'acqua, Faloppio, LietoColle Libri, 2004.
Storie dell'armadillo, Milan, Quaderni di Orfeo, 2006.
 Le terre emerse. Poesie scelte 1985–2008, Torino, Einaudi, 2009.

Essays 

Il nervo di Arnold e altre letture. Saggi e note sulla poesia contemporanea, Milan, Marcos y Marcos, 2007.
 Una goccia di splendore. Riflessioni sulla scuola, Bellinzona, Casagrande, 2008.

Translations 

Philippe Jaccottet, Il Barbagianni. L'Ignorante, con un saggio di Jean Starobinski, Einaudi, Torino, 1992.
Nuno Júdice, Adagio, Sestante, Ripatransone, 1994. 
Philippe Jaccottet, Edera e calce, Centro studi Franco Scataglini, Ancona, 1995.
Philippe Jaccottet, Libretto, Scheiwiller, Milan, 1995.
Philippe Jaccottet, Paesaggio con figure assenti, A. Dadò/Coll. CH, Locarno, 1996.
Philippe Jaccottet, Alla luce d'inverno. Pensieri sotto le nuvole, Marcos y Marcos, Milan, 1997.
Nel pieno giorno dell'oscurità, antologia della poesia francese contemporanea, Milan, Marcos y Marcos, 2000.
Corinna Bille, Cento piccole storie crudeli, Casagrande, Bellinzona, 2001.
 Philippe Jaccottet, E tuttavia. Note dal botro, Milan, Marcos y Marcos, 2006.
 Philippe Jaccottet, La ciotola di Morandi, Casagrande, Bellinzona, 2007.

Bibliography 

Mattia Cavadini, Il poeta ammutolito. Letteratura senza io: un aspetto della postmodernità poetica. Philippe Jaccottet e Fabio Pusterla, Milano, Marcos y Marcos, 2004.
Pietro De Marchi, Uno specchio di parole scritte. Da Parini a Pusterla, da Gozzi a Meneghello, Rimini, Cesati, 2003.
Mathilde Vischer, La traduction, du style vers la poétique: Philippe Jaccottet et Fabio Pusterla en dialogue, Paris, Kimé Editions, 2009.

External links 
Fabio Pusterla in Le Culturactif Suisse

1957 births
Living people
University of Pavia alumni
Academic staff of the University of Geneva
Swiss translators
Swiss male poets
Swiss essayists
People from Mendrisio
Male essayists